tempuri.org is the test default namespace URI used by Microsoft development products, like Visual Studio.  It is available for XML Web services that are under development, but published XML Web services should use a more permanent namespace. The term is strictly a placeholder and all instances of it should be replaced with a more meaningful URI in production systems.

The World Wide Web Consortium recommends that XML namespaces be a Uniform Resource Identifier.  "tempuri" is short for Temporary Uniform Resource Identifier.

An XML Web service should be identified by a namespace that is controlled by its company. For example, a company's Internet domain name could be used as part of the namespace. Although many XML Web service namespaces look like URLs, they need not point to actual resources on the Web. (XML Web service namespaces are URIs.)

For XML Web services created using ASP.NET, the default namespace can be changed using the WebService attribute's Namespace property. The WebService attribute is an attribute applied to the class that contains the XML Web service methods.

The tempuri.org domain is owned by Microsoft and redirects to their Bing search engine.

Tempuri.com also redirects to a search for Tempuri on Bing.

References
 WSDL - web services definition language
 Namespaces in XML 1.0
 RFC2396

Microsoft server technology